Peri Masali (means Fairy Tale) is a 2014  Turkish romantic drama film inspired by a real story. Starring Burcu Kıratlı and Emre Kızılırmak in lead roles. The film received good reviews & was an instant commercial success. Also  noted as one of Burcu Kıratlı  best performances made her win Best New Actress Award at Digital Media Awards in 2015. The film is directed by Biray Dalkıran music composed by Gürkan Çakici & cinematography done by Biray Dalkiran, Mehmet Yardim, Ümit Özyurt In 2018 Peri Masalı has been selected as one of the Best Turkish Love Films of 2000.

Plot
The film tells the story of a cancer survivor name Peri a gentle soul with a love of music a violin player & her boyfriend Mert. Mert and Peri are deeply in love and have been together for a long time. But Peri redevelops the fatal disease. In the meantime, Mert proposes to Peri. Peri tells Mert her only condition before accepting the proposal. Mert will try to fulfill the wish of the woman he loves. The film was a tale of unconditional love & generation gap.

Cast

Awards and nominations

References